Baihuting Station is a metro station of Line 1 of the Fuzhou Metro. It is located on Zexu Avenue in Cangshan District, Fuzhou, Fujian, China. It started operation on May 18, 2016.

References 

Railway stations in China opened in 2016
Fuzhou Metro stations